The Pyrenean brook salamander or Pyrenean newt (Calotriton asper),, is a largely aquatic species of salamander in the family Salamandridae. It is found in the Pyrenees of Andorra, France, and Spain. The IUCN lists it as least concern.

Description

The females are usually larger than the males. The body is sturdy with a flattened head and small eyes, and the limbs are short. There are no parotoid glands and the skin is covered with small, rough tubercles. The colour is very variable, the upper side usually being some shade of olive, grey, charcoal, or muddy brown, sometimes mottled with ochre, with an intermittent yellowish stripe down the spine. The underside has a row of dark splotches at either side and the centre is red, orange, or yellow. The male has a rounded cloacal swelling while the female has a conical one.

Distribution and habitat
It is a mostly aquatic species usually frequenting slow-moving streams and shallow mountain lakes. It favours water below 15 °C (59 °F) with scarce vegetation on rocky or pebbly bottoms. Some Pyrenean brook salamanders live entirely inside caves where they breed over a long period of the year due to lack of day length stimulus.

Biology
The Pyrenean brook salamander is infrequently seen, though it is active by day, as well as by night. It is mostly aquatic in summer. It feeds on insects and other slow-moving invertebrate prey, and is itself eaten by trout, so it is often scarce in locations in which they are abundant. It is sensitive to pesticides in the water which are absorbed through the skin and accumulate in the tissues.

The Pyrenean brook salamander sometimes aestivates in hot weather in the lower parts of its range. It hibernates in winter on land at higher altitudes, emerging in the spring. During courtship, the male displays his brightly coloured underparts before grasping the female around the loins with his tail and transferring one to four spermatophores directly into her cloaca in a process that lasts several hours. The female lays 20 to 40 eggs over the course of a few weeks, sticking them to rocks or inside crevices with her extensible cloaca. The eggs hatch after about six weeks; the larvae have external gills and are entirely carnivorous. They may overwinter one or more times before metamorphosis and become mature in two or more years, depending on altitude, with the females taking longer. The juvenile newts are a dark colour with a thin, yellow line along the spine.

References

External links

Further reading

Amphibians of Europe
Amphibians described in 1852
Taxa named by Alfredo Dugès
Newts
Taxonomy articles created by Polbot